Ricky Martin (born 1971) is a Puerto Rican musician. 

It may also refer to:

 Ricky Martin (1991 album), an album by Ricky Martin
 Ricky Martin (1999 album), an album by Ricky Martin
 Ricky Martin, winner of The Apprentice (British series 8)

See also
Richard Martin (disambiguation)

Martin, Ricky